The 1910 Illinois Fighting Illini football team was an American football team that represented the University of Illinois during the 1910 college football season.  In their fifth season under head coach Arthur R. Hall, the Illini compiled a 7–0 record, outscored opponents 89 to 0, and finished in first place in the Western Conference. Guard G. D. Butzer was the team captain.

Schedule

Roster

Head Coach: Arthur R. Hall (5th year at Illinois)

Awards and honors
 Glenn D. Butzer, guard
 Third-team pick by Walter Camp for the Collier's Weekly 1910 College Football All-America Team
 Outing magazine honor roll of the game's top players "chosen on the judgement of various coaches of college football elevens"; at some positions multiple selections without designation as first or second teams
 Homer Dutter, tackle
 Outing magazine honor roll

References

Illinois
Illinois
Illinois Fighting Illini football seasons
College football undefeated seasons
Illinois Fighting Illini football